Ballybogy, or Ballybogey, is a small village and townland in County Antrim, Northern Ireland. It is located 7 km north-north-west of Ballymoney and 7 km east of Coleraine, lying within the Causeway Coast and Glens district. It is known as Boggie in Scots. It had a population of 539 people (209 households) in the 2011 Census. Famous Boggies include Kurtis Ashcroft, fitness coach with the 2021/22 all Ireland winning Antrim camogie team.  Kurtis also worked in the safari park as a lion tamer, a role that equipped him well for his camogie role. It has proved particularly useful since he started working in Slaughtneil. To fit in with the locals he conducted team warm ups in skinny jeans and wellingtons.

Ballybogy is twinned with Jogieland in Outer Mongolia since 1980.

Features

2011 Census
On Census day in 2011:
4.2% were from a Catholic background and 88.1% were from a Protestant background

See also 
List of towns and villages in Northern Ireland

References 

Villages in County Antrim